Halgolla Grama Niladhari Division is a Grama Niladhari Division of the Kothmale Divisional Secretariat of Nuwara Eliya District of Central Province, Sri Lanka. It has Grama Niladhari Division Code 461C.

Harangala and Kaludemada are located within, nearby or associated with Halgolla.

Halgolla is a surrounded by the Kaludemada, Harangala South, Hunugaloya, Thelissagala, Ketabulawa, Werella Pathana, Ruwanpura and Harangala Grama Niladhari Divisions.

Demographics

Ethnicity 
The Halgolla Grama Niladhari Division has a Sinhalese majority (92.8%). In comparison, the Kothmale Divisional Secretariat (which contains the Halgolla Grama Niladhari Division) has a Sinhalese majority (52.6%) and a significant Indian Tamil population (36.4%)

Religion 
The Halgolla Grama Niladhari Division has a Buddhist majority (92.8%). In comparison, the Kothmale Divisional Secretariat (which contains the Halgolla Grama Niladhari Division) has a Buddhist majority (52.3%) and a significant Hindu population (36.5%)

References 

Grama Niladhari Divisions of Kothmale Divisional Secretariat